Paopi 20 - Coptic Calendar - Paopi 22

The twenty-first day of the Coptic month of Paopi, the second month of the Coptic year. On a common year, this day corresponds to October 18, of the Julian Calendar, and October 31, of the Gregorian Calendar. This day falls in the Coptic season of Peret, the season of emergence.

Commemorations

Feasts 

 Monthly commemoration of the Virgin Mary, the Theotokos

Saints 

 The departure of the Righteous Joel the Prophet
 The departure of Saint Reweis (Freig/Tegi)

Other commemorations 

 The relocation of the body of Saint Lazarus, the beloved of the Lord

References 

Days of the Coptic calendar